The Laredo Broncos were a professional baseball team based in Laredo, Texas, in the United States. The Broncos were a member of United League Baseball, an independent professional league which was not affiliated with Major League Baseball or Minor League Baseball.  From the 2006 season to 2010, the Broncos played their home games at Veterans Field.

History
In their first season, after a disappointing 5-15 start, the Broncos earned respect by having a winning record down the stretch and winning 11 of their last 16 games, making a trip to the playoffs where they pushed the first place Edinburg Coyotes to their limit before being eliminated. In 2010, the Laredo Broncos folded because ULB ceased to exist and the fact that the city of Laredo preferred to lease the future Laredo Ballpark to a then new expansion franchise team Laredo Lemurs in the American Association than the Broncos since ULB had filed for Chapter 11 bankruptcy.

Mascot

Buster the Bronco was the mascot of the Laredo Broncos for all 5 seasons.  The mascot's name and image were selected by the executive staff before the 2006 season started.

Front office

General Manager    - Jose Melendez
Director of Sales     - Albert Herrera
Director of Operations    - B.D. "Bill" Hancock

Team record

Executive staff
 General Manager - Jose Melendez 2006 - 2010
 Director of Sales - Albert Herrera  2006 - 2008
 Director of Operations - Bill Hancock 2006 - 2008
 Director of Media & Marketing - Ray Melendez 2006, 2010

All-Stars

Players
2006
 Edwin Maldonado, 2B (Most Valuable Player)
 Darryl Roque, RHP
 Jose Salas, C/1B
 Arnoldo Ponce, SS
 Orlando Cruz, CF

2007
 Luis Arroyo, LHP
 Orlando Cruz, OF
 Santo Hernandez, RHP
 Hector Lebron, 1B
 Juan Lebron, OF
 Henry Lozado, RHP
 Edwin Maldonado, 3B

2008
 Santo Hernandez, RHP
 Gregorio Martinez, RHP
 Luany Sanchez, C
 Dwayne White, OF
 John Odom, RHP
 Matt Bauman, LHP

2010
 Jose Canseco, DH
 Santo Hernandez, RHP
 Juan Peralta, RHP
 Salvador Paniagua, C
 Kenny Gilbert, OF
 Jason Diaz, OF

Coaches
2006
 Dalphi Correa, 3B Coach
 Larry Van Allen, Hitting Coach

2010
 Jose Canseco, Bench Coach
 Alex Ortiz, Hitting Coach

Past Managers
 Michael Smith (2006)
 Dan Shwam (2006)
 Dan Shwam (2007)
 Angel "Papo" Davila (2008)
 Ricardo Cuevas (2009)
 Dan Firova (2010)

External links

 Laredo Broncos website

United League Baseball teams
Defunct baseball teams in Texas
Sports in Laredo, Texas
Defunct independent baseball league teams
2006 establishments in Texas
Baseball teams established in 2006
2010 disestablishments in Texas
Baseball teams disestablished in 2010